Chamika Deemantha Gunasekara (born 25 November 1999) is a Sri Lankan cricketer. He made his international debut for the Sri Lanka cricket team in January 2022.

Career
He made his List A debut on 17 December 2019, for Nondescripts Cricket Club in the 2019–20 Invitation Limited Over Tournament. He made his Twenty20 debut on 4 January 2020, for Nondescripts Cricket Club in the 2019–20 SLC Twenty20 Tournament. He made his first-class debut on 1 February 2020, for Nondescripts Cricket Club in the 2019–20 Premier League Tournament. In August 2021, he was named in the SLC Greys team for the 2021 SLC Invitational T20 League tournament. In November 2021, he was selected to play for the Jaffna Kings following the players' draft for the 2021 Lanka Premier League.

In November 2021, he was named in Sri Lanka's Test squad for their series against the West Indies. In January 2022, he was named in Sri Lanka's One Day International (ODI) squad for their series against Zimbabwe. He made his ODI debut on 16 January 2022, for Sri Lanka against Zimbabwe.

References

External links
 

1995 births
Living people
Sri Lankan cricketers
Sri Lanka One Day International cricketers
Nondescripts Cricket Club cricketers
Place of birth missing (living people)